Mohamed Pasha Jaff, was born in 1714 and was considered the supreme leader of the Jaff tribe. The Sherwana Castle was built by him. The Jaff dialect (called Jaffi) is part of Sorani, a south-southeastern branch of Kurdish language family. The region inhabited by this tribe is southwest of Sanandaj all the way to Javanroud, and also areas around the city of Sulaimaniyah in Southern Kurdistan.

History 

Mohamed Pasha Jaff received the noble title of Pasha by the Ottoman Empire.

At 20 years old he settled in Sherwana Castle in Kalar region in Iraqi Kurdistan.  His determination to protect the Jaff tribe led to several clashes in Iran and Turkey. The Jaff tribe still exists today, and has three million people.  Man of strong convictions and great love for knowledge, sent various explorations to America.

See also 
Mahmud Pasha Jaff

References 

 Ely Banister Soane, Report on the Sulaimania district of Kurdistan. 1910
 Ely Banister Soane, Notes on the Southern Tribes of Kurdistan, Civil commissioner, Baghdad. 1918
 Personalities in Kurdistan, Civil Commissioner, Baghdad. 1918

Bibliography

1714 births
Kurdish rulers
Year of death missing
18th-century Kurdish people
18th-century people from the Ottoman Empire
Pashas